Henry Laufer (born January 3, 1990), known professionally as Shlohmo, is an American musician and producer from Los Angeles. He is best known for his experimental production style and for founding the record label Wedidit Records.

Career
Shlohmo, born Henry Laufer, is a musician and artist from Los Angeles. Laufer has released three studio albums, Bad Vibes (2011), Dark Red (2015), and The End (2019), as well as several EP's and collaborative mixtapes.

Shlohmo first received attention in 2011 for his first full-length LP, Bad Vibes, which was featured on Pitchfork and Resident Advisor. 

Following “Bad Vibes,” Shlohmo continued releasing EPs, including “Vacation” (2012) and “Laid Out” (2013), remixing tracks such as Drake and The Weeknd's “Crew Love” as well as producing singles such as Banks’s “Brain.”

In 2014, Shlohmo released "No More", a joint EP with singer Jeremih. 

In 2015, Shlohmo released his second LP, “Dark Red”. 

In 2016, Shlohmo produced music for Post Malone, Tory Lanez, Lil Yachty, Corbin (Spooky Black), and Yung Lean.

In 2017, Shlohmo executive produced Corbin's debut LP, “Mourn”. The LP was written and recorded exclusively at Wedidit's studio in Los Angeles and produced entirely by Shlohmo & D33J. Corbin and Shlohmo co-headlined a North American tour following the album's release.

Shlohmo started a free mix series and visual collaboration titled “For Tha Summer” that showcases his experimental sample-based rap remixes, combined with spliced visuals. 

In 2018, Shlohmo produced two tracks on Joji's debut album, while readying his own next solo album.

Shlohmo released his third LP “The End” in March 2019.

Discography

Studio albums
 Bad Vibes (2011)
 Dark Red (2015)
 The End (2019)

Compilation albums
 Shlomoshun Deluxe (2010)
 Shlo-Fi (Deluxe) (2011)
 Fine, Thanks (2011)
 Bad Vibes - 5th Anniversary Addition (2016)
 Bad Vibes: Rarities + Extras (2016)

EPs
 Shlo-Fi (2009)
 Beat CD 09 (2010)
 Shlomoshun (2010)
 Camping (2010)
 Places (2011)
 Vacation (2012)
 Laid Out (2013)
 No More (2014) 
 Rock Music (2019)
 Heaven Inc. (2020)

Singles
 "Sippy Cup" b/w "Post Atmosphere (Baths Remix)" (2010)
 "Places" b/w "Seriously" (2011)
 "Later" (2011)
 "Bo Peep (Do U Right)" (2013) 
 "No More" (2013) 
 "Emerge From Smoke" (2014)
 "Buried" (2015)
 "Wen 222" (2018)
 "The End" (2019)
 "Looking at Plants" (2020)

Productions
 Flash Bang Grenada - "Hyperbolic" from 10 Haters (2011)
 Banks - "Brain" from Goddess (2014)
 Tory Lanez - "Acting Like" from Cruel Intentions (2015)
 Post Malone - "Boy Bandz" (2015)
 $ilkmoney - "The Fine Household" (feat. Cyrax & Lord Linco) (2015)
 Star Wars - "Druid Caravan of Smoke" from Star Wars Headspace (2015)
 Lil Yachty - “Ice Water” (2016)
 Kane Grocerys - "Columbine Homicide" (with D33J) (2016)
 Adamn Killa - "Jeremy Lin" from Back 2 Ballin (2016)
 Adamn Killa - "Ten" (feat. Yung Lean) (single) (2016)
 Yung Lean - "Hop Out" (feat. Luckaleannn) from Frost God (2016)
 Corbin - "Ice Boy" (with D33J) (2017)
 Joji - "WHY AM I STILL IN LA" (with D33J) (2018)
 Joji - "COME THRU" (2018)
 Salem - "Red River" from Fires in Heaven (2020)

Remixes
 Robot Koch - "Gorom Sen (Shlohmo Remix)" from Death Star Droid Remix EP (2010)
 Gonjasufi - "Change (Shlohmo Remix)" from The Caliph's Tea Party (2010)
 Comfort Fit - "Sky Raper (Shlohmo Remix)" (2010)
 Burial - "Shell of Light (Shlohmo Remix)" (2011)
 Drake - "Marvin's Room (Shlohmo's thru tha floor remix)" (2011)
 Drake - "I'm On One (Shlohmo Remix)" (2011)
 Drake ft. The Weeknd - "Crew Love (Shlohmo Remix)" (2012)
 Salva - "Yellobone (Shlohmo + 2KWTVR Remix)" from Yellobone (2011)
 Tomas Barfod - "Broken Glass (Shlohmo Remix)" (2011)
 Aaliyah feat. Drake - "Enough Said (Shlohmo Remix)" (2012)
 Lianne La Havas - "Forget (Shlohmo Remix)" (2012)
 Little Dragon - "Sunshine (Shlohmo Remix)" (2012)
 LOL Boys - "Changes (Shlohmo Remix)" from Changes (2012)
 Flume - "Sleepless (Shlohmo Remix)" (2012)
 Ryan Hemsworth - "Colour & Movement (Shlohmo Remix)" from Last Words (2012)
 Haerts - "Wings (Shlohmo Remix)" (2013)
 Samo Sound Boy - "Your Love (Shlohmo Remix)" (2013)
 Young Scooter - "Colombia (Shlohmo Remix)" (2013)
 Just Friends - "Avalanche (Shlohmo Remix)" (2013)
 Electric Guest - "The Bait (Shlohmo Remix)" (2013)
 Laura Mvula - "She (Shlohmo Remix)" (2013)
 Purple - "The Club (Shlohmo Remix)" (2013)
 Jeremih - "Fuck You All The Time (Shlohmo Remix)" (2013)
 Perera Elsewhere - "Light Bulb (Shlohmo Remix)" (2014)
 Tory Lanez - "Say It (Shlohmo Remix)" (2016)
 Gucci Mane - "Hot (Shlohmo Remix)" (2016)
 PnB Rock - "Selfish (Shlohmo Remix)" (2017)
 Juice Jackal - "Looney Toon (Shlohmo Remix)" (2018)

References

External links
 
 
 

American electronic musicians
American hip hop record producers
Musicians from Los Angeles
Living people
Crossroads School alumni
Record producers from California
1990 births